Thrombomodulin (TM), CD141 or BDCA-3 is an integral membrane protein expressed on the surface of endothelial cells and serves as a cofactor for thrombin. It reduces blood coagulation by converting thrombin to an anticoagulant enzyme from a procoagulant enzyme. Thrombomodulin is also expressed on human mesothelial cell, monocyte and a dendritic cell subset.

Genetics and structure 

In humans, thrombomodulin is encoded by the  gene. The protein has a molecular mass of 74kDa, and consists of a single chain with six tandemly repeated EGF-like domains, a Serine/Threonine-rich spacer and a transmembrane domain.
It is a member of the C-type lectin domain (CTLD) group 14 family.

Function 

Thrombomodulin functions as a cofactor in the thrombin-induced activation of protein C in the anticoagulant pathway by forming a 1:1 stoichiometric complex with thrombin. This raises the speed of protein C activation thousandfold. Thrombomodulin-bound thrombin has procoagulant effect at the same time by inhibiting fibrinolysis by cleaving thrombin-activatable fibrinolysis inhibitor (TAFI, aka carboxypeptidase B2) into its active form.

Thrombomodulin is a glycoprotein on the surface of endothelial cells that, in addition to binding thrombin, regulates C3b inactivation by factor I. Mutations in the thrombomodulin gene (THBD) have also been reported to be associated with atypical hemolytic-uremic syndrome (aHUS).

The antigen described as BDCA-3 has turned out to be identical to thrombomodulin. Thus, it was revealed that this molecule also occurs on a very rare (0.02%) subset of human dendritic cells called MDC2. Its function on these cells is unknown.

Interactions 

Thrombomodulin has been shown to interact with thrombin.

References

Further reading

External links 
  GeneReviews/NCBI/NIH/UW entry on Atypical Hemolytic-Uremic Syndrome
  OMIM entries on Atypical Hemolytic-Uremic Syndrome

Coagulation system
Clusters of differentiation